Georgian Jews in Israel, also known as Gruzinim (From Hebrew גרוזינים Gruzínim, meaning Georgians), are immigrants and descendants of the immigrants of the Georgian Jewish communities, who now reside within the state of Israel. They number around 75,000 to 80,000.

History

Ottoman period
The Georgian Jews are from the times of First Temple 2600 years ago in Tbilisi,

Beginning in 1863, groups of Jews began making aliyah, mostly for religious reasons. By 1916, 439 Georgian Jews lived in Mutasarrifate of Jerusalem, mostly in Jerusalem city near the Damascus Gate. Most Georgian Jews who made aliyah were poor and worked as freight-handlers in Jerusalem.

Israeli period
After the Six-Day War, huge numbers of Soviet Jews began protesting for the right to immigrate to Israel, and many applied for exit visas. Georgian Jews made up a large percentage of this number. They were among the first to begin protesting, and were among the most militant of campaigners. In August 1969, eighteen families wrote to the Human Rights Commission of the United Nations demanding permission to make aliyah. This was the first public insistence by Soviet Jews for immigration to Israel. The Israeli government and the Jewish world campaigned heavily on behalf of the plight of the Soviet Jewry. In July 1971, a group of Georgian Jews went on a hunger strike outside a Moscow post office. The determination of Soviet Jewish activists and international pressure led the Soviets to lessen their harsh anti-Jewish policies. During the 1970s, the Soviets permitted limited Jewish emigration to Israel, and about 30,000 Georgian Jews made aliyah, with thousands of others leaving for other countries. Approximately 17% of the Soviet Jewish population emigrated at this time. In 1979, the Jewish population in Georgia was 28,300 and, by 1989, it had decreased to 24,800. Thus, the community, which had numbered about 80,000 as recently as the 1970s, largely emigrated to Israel.

While most Soviet Jewish emigration was individual, Georgian Jewish emigration was communal. Due to Georgian Jewish traditions of strong, extended families and the strict, patriarchal nature of Georgian Jewish families, Georgian Jews immigrated as whole communities, with emigration of individuals causing a chain reaction leading to more emigration, and brought their community structures with them. For example, nearly the entire Jewish population of at least two Georgian towns made aliyah. At the time the emigration started, Israel had a policy of scattering the population around the country, and was experiencing a housing shortage, with the result that Georgian Jews were assigned housing in different parts of the country. The Georgian Jews began demanding that they be concentrated together, and the crisis reached a fever pitch when several families threatened to return to Georgia, and new immigrants, forewarned by predecessors, began demanding to be placed in specific areas upon arrival. Although Prime Minister Golda Meir criticized the Georgian Jews' desire to "isolate themselves into ghettos", the Israeli Immigrant Absorption Ministry eventually bowed to their demands, and began to create concentrations of around 200 families in twelve areas of the country.

In Israel, Georgian Jewish immigrants successfully integrated into society, but faced certain problems. Georgian Jewish immigrants were usually able to find jobs with ease, and often worked in light industry jobs, such as dock workers, porters, and construction workers, but faced certain issues. One major issue was religion; the Georgian Jews were often devout and had fiercely clung to their traditions in the Soviet Union, and were stunned to discover that Israeli Jews were mostly secular. As a result, Georgian Jewish immigrants demanded their own separate synagogues to continue their unique religious traditions, which the government agreed to, and enrolled their children in religious schools rather than regular schools.

In Israel, most Georgian Jews settled near the coast in cities such as Lod, Bat Yam, Ashdod, Holon and Rehovot. There are Georgian Jews in Jerusalem as well, with several prominent synagogues.

Notable people
 Yitzhak Gagula
 Efraim Gur
 Haim Megrelashvili
 Moran Mazor
 Avraham Michaeli
 Tzipi Hotovely

See also
 History of the Jews in Georgia
 Mountain Jews
 Iranian Jews in Israel
 Jewish ethnic divisions
 Georgia–Israel relations

References

Georgia (country)–Israel relations
 
Israeli Jews by national origin